In military terms, 60th Division may refer to:

 Infantry divisions
60th (2/2nd London) Division
60th Division (People's Republic of China)
60th Infantry Division (France)
60th Infantry Division (Germany)
60 Infantry Division Sabratha (Italy)
60th Division (Imperial Japanese Army)

Armoured divisions
 60th Tank Division (1941–1942) (USSR)
 60th Tank Division (1965–1989) (USSR)